Ursula Eva Maria Kock am Brink (born 10 July 1961 in Mülheim an der Ruhr) is a German television presenter.

Life 
From 1981 to 1984, Kock am Brink studied German studies, Spanish studies and Social sciences at university in Bonn. From 1989 to 2010, Kock am Brink was television presenter for several game shows and other TV shows on different German broadcasters (RTL, ZDF, WDR). In 2003, Kock am Brink married Theo Baltz. They separated in March 2010.

Filmography 

 Minute to Win It
 Die Lotto-Show
 Die 100.000 Mark Show
 Verzeih mir
 Glücksritter

Awards 

 1995: Goldene Kamera for Die 100.000 Mark Show
 1998: Telestar, Best Moderation Entertainment for Die Lotto-Show

References

External links 
 
 

German women television presenters
German game show hosts
Living people
1961 births
RTL Group people
ZDF people